Lipová is a municipality and village in Cheb District in the Karlovy Vary Region of the Czech Republic. It has about 700 inhabitants.

Administrative parts
Villages of Dolní Lažany, Dolní Lipina, Doubrava, Horní Lažany, Mechová, Mýtina, Palič and Stebnice are administrative parts of Lipová.

Geography

The northern part of the municipality lies in the Cheb Basin, the southern part extends into the Fichtel Mountains and the southeastern part into the Upper Palatine Forest. Near the village of Mýtina there is the Železná hůrka National Nature Monument with an extinct Quaternary volcano.

References

Villages in Cheb District